Ginestra may refer to:

 Gioiosa Ionica, town and comune in Italy in the province of Reggio Calabria, region of Calabria
 Gioiosa Marea, municipality in the Metropolitan City of Messina in the Italian region Sicily

See also 

 Gioia (disambiguation)
 La Joyosa
 La Vila Joiosa